Andrey Korotkov (Андрéй Короткóв) (3 June 1954 in Sevastopol – 10 February 2012) was First Deputy Communications and Informatisation Minister in Russia (2002–2004) and Senior Vice President and CIO of Bank VTB (2004–2006).

Career
Before his death, he was a professor at Moscow State Institute of Foreign Affairs and the Academy of National Economy under the Government of Russia Federation. He had been previously an executive advisor to the Director General of Federal Passenger Company (Russian Railways) and member of the High-level Advisory group of the UN Global Alliance for ICT and Development (GAID).

In 2003 he briefly attracted worldwide media attention, when he participated in an unusual attack on Russia's most prominent spammer, American Language Center (ALC).

Korotkov, received spam from ALC many times. Several attempts to complain and "unsubscribe" were unsuccessful, but soon the spam messages started to address him by name.

During an interview to Rambler-Audio news project, Korotkov addressed the American Language Center:

Golden Telecom, one of the largest Russian ISP, organised automatic dialing to ALC phone numbers. Every 10 seconds a phone call was made and the recorded message given above was played.

He died after long illness on 10 February 2012, aged 57.

Biography in brief

Biography
Andrey Korotkov was born on June 3, 1954, in Sevastopol. He holds a Ph.D in economics and has been involved in the research on the informatisation of banking business in Russia in the framework of the knowledge based economy development. He also holds a Ph.D from the Moscow State University in philology The thesis was dedicated to the problem of digital divide bridging as basis of the modern strategy of information society.

JSC Russian Railways
Andrey Korotkov joined JSC Russian Railways at the important stage of its IT infrastructure development and is in charge of a number of prominent innovative IT projects including e-ticket, e-workflow, corporate informatisation policy modernization, etc.

VTB
As Senior vice-president and CIO of VTB Andrey Korotkov, among other highly relevant for contemporary banking sphere IT innovations, initiated the development of the unified VTB group technological policy and started the infrastructural information systems and banking services and applications integration aimed at the final Service Oriented Architecture implementation.
Under his direction VTB has also realised a number of prominent ICT projects including the branch automated banking systems unification, corporate data warehouse construction ant others. Bank has also extended the roster of its international strategic IT partners after having signed contracts with Microsoft, IBM, Hewlett-Packard, Cisco Systems and others.
In his position of the High-level advisor to the Chairman of VTB, Mr. Korotkov has been steering through the analysis of mergers and acquisitions procedure legislation in the banking sphere both in Russia and in the EU.

The Government of the Russian Federation
Since 1996 to 2002 Mr. Korotkov held various positions in the Government of the Russian Federation and Administration of the President of Russia including journalistic and PR activities in the Television and Radio complex of Kremlin and the 5 cabinet office of the Prime Minister of Russia. In 2002 he was appointed the First Deputy Minister of the Ministry for Telecommunications and Informatisation of the Russian Federation and in this position was responsible for a number of major federal information technology projects in Russia. Among them are the national critical infrastructure elements protection development, State automated system “Elections” elaboration, free software implementation in the governmental institutions promotion, etc.
He is famous as one of the most prominent ideologists of the information society development in Russia. As the First Deputy Minister of the Ministry for Telecommunications and Informatisation of Russia, Mr. Korotkov was the head of the First Directorate of the Federal “E-Russia” Program and carried out tenders for the Federal projects realization in Moscow and regions of the Russian Federations. Mr. Korotkov has also regularly represented Russia in the UN information and communication activities, in particular was the head of the Russian delegation for the First phase of the World Summit on the information society held in December 2003 in Geneva.

The UN activities
As a member of the UN ICT Task Force and an adviser to the UN General-Secretary on the ICT issues, he initiated the foundation of the Moscow UN ICT Task Force Bureau of the European and Central Asian Regional Node and used to be the head of the organisation.
Since the foundation of the Global Alliance for ICT and Development, Mr. Korotkov has become a member of the GAID and is taking part in the GAID activities.
In the framework of his international activities Mr. Korotkov participated in a number of international economic and ICT oriented initiatives including negotiations with OECD in Honolulu and OPEC, and World Economic Forum.

Teaching activities
As an expert on ICT, information economy and artificial languages and semiotics, Mr. Korotkov teaches in a number of Russian universities (ex.: Moscow State University, Moscow State Institute of International Relationship, Russian Academy of National Economy) with his educational courses on the information society and high technologies development. He has published numerous articles and books on subjects ranging from the information systems implementation in business and banking spheres, electronic financial system in the world economy and governmental policy for the information society development in Russia to artificial intelligence research.

Journalism
Mr. Korotkov has started his career in 1992 as a special correspondent of the TASS News Agency and traveled a lot around CIS countries making reports on political and economic issues. He resigned from the News Agency as the Deputy editor-in-chief of the audiovisual department.

Andrey Korotkov was survived by his wife and two sons. He was personally keen on photography and design.

References

External links
Don't Spam This Deputy Minister, by Simon Ostrovsky, Moscow Times, July 24, 2003
Russian Minister Gets Spammed, Spams Back

1954 births
2012 deaths
Moscow State University alumni
Academic staff of Moscow State University
Academic staff of the Moscow State Institute of International Relations
Russian journalists
Russian politicians
1st class Active State Councillors of the Russian Federation